Michelle Bholat (born 1958) is an American physician. She is an associate professor of family medicine at the University of California, Los Angeles, where she serves as vice-chair of clinical affairs and is a member of the Medical Board of California.

Life
Bholat was born in Los Angeles in 1958. She received a bachelor's degree in biological science from California State University in 1987, her M.D. at the University of California, Irvine, in 1992, and her M.P.H. in health care policy at the University of California, Los Angeles in 1997.

Career
Bholat earned the title of vice-chair of the Department of Family Medicine at the David Geffen School of Medicine at UCLA, making her the first Latina to be appointed to this role. In this position, she actively works to hire physicians from disadvantaged backgrounds as well as collaborate with and trains physicians from Mexico.

In 2013 Bholat co-founded the International Medical Graduate Program (IMG) with Patrick Dowling at the University of California Los Angeles, a program designed to help Latino immigrant doctors seeking medical certification in the United States. As of 2017 the program had  helped 66 Latino doctors to integrate into the California medical community.

Awards and appointments
Bholat's work to incorporate compassion and cultural sensitivity into medicine has earned her the Los Angeles County Department of Health Services Recognition of Service Award, as well as a fellowship with the National Hispanic Medical Association. In 2014 she received the Yancey award from the MLK community Health Foundation.

As of 2017 Bholat was an appointed member of the Medical Board of California. In 2015 she was elected to the board of directors of the Beach Cities Health District.

References

Physicians from California
1958 births
Living people
University of California, Irvine alumni
David Geffen School of Medicine at UCLA faculty
20th-century American physicians
21st-century American physicians
20th-century American women physicians
21st-century American women physicians
American women academics